Tunica is an unincorporated community in West Feliciana Parish, Louisiana, United States. Its elevation is 66 feet (20 m).

The United States Postal Service operates the Tunica Post Office along Louisiana Highway 66.

Two sites on the National Register of Historic Places, Trudeau House and Trudeau Landing, are in Tunica.

Education

Residents are zoned to West Feliciana Parish Public Schools. Primary schools serving Tunica are Bains Lower Elementary School and Bains Elementary School in Bains. Secondary schools serving Tunica are West Feliciana Middle School and West Feliciana High School in Bains. The West Feliciana Parish Library is located in St. Francisville. The library, previously a part of the Audubon Regional Library System, became independent in January 2004. West Feliciana Parish is in the service area of Baton Rouge Community College.

Elementary school children previously attended Tunica Elementary School. The original school administration office and wings opened in 1953, with a third wing and multi-purpose building added at a later point. The school is several miles from the main entrance of Louisiana State Penitentiary (LSP), and some of its students lived on the LSP grounds and surrounding area within the Tunica Hills area. On May 18, 2011, due to budget cuts, the parish school board voted to close Tunica Elementary.

References

External links
 Tunica Trails

Unincorporated communities in West Feliciana Parish, Louisiana
Unincorporated communities in Louisiana
Louisiana populated places on the Mississippi River